Baskiye is a rural locality (a village) in Lobanovskoye Rural Settlement, Permsky District, Perm Krai, Russia. The population was 3 as of 2010.

Geography 
Baskiye is located 37 km south of Perm (the district's administrative centre) by road. Kasimovo is the nearest rural locality.

References 

Rural localities in Permsky District